Kenan Topolović (born 3 March 1998) is a Croatian-born Bosnian professional footballer who plays as a goalkeeper for Bosnian Premier League club Rudar Prijedor the Bosnia and Herzegovina U21 national team.

Club career

Early career
Topolović started off his career in the youth team of Sarajevo, before joining the youth team of city rivals Željezničar in 2015.

One year after playing for Željezničar, he went to Croatia, where he signed for both the youth team and the first team of Croatian 1. HNL club Cibalia on 23 October 2016.

Inter Zaprešić
In the summer of 2017, Topolović signed with 1. HNL club Inter Zaprešić.

He made his debut for Inter on 19 May 2018, in a 3–1 away loss against Dinamo Zagreb.

Borac Banja Luka
In January 2019, Topolović signed with, back then still, First League of RS club Borac Banja Luka. He made his debut for Borac on 9 March 2019, in a 0–2 away win against Slavija Sarajevo.

With the club, Topolović won the 2018–19 First League of RS title in May 2019, and thus got promoted to the Bosnian Premier League.

Zrinjski Mostar
On 22 June 2019, Topolović signed a three-year contract with Zrinjski Mostar after leaving Borac a few days earlier. He made his official debut for Zrinjski on 23 November 2019, in a 0–0 away league draw against his former club Borac, in which he came in as a 69th minute substitute for injured Ivan Brkić. Topolović decided to leave Zrinjski in January 2020.

Rudar Prijedor
Not long after leaving Zrinjski, on 23 January 2020, Topolović signed a contract with First League of RS club Rudar Prijedor. He made his official debut for the club in a league match against Krupa on 7 March 2020.

On 5 June 2020, Topolović extended his contract with Rudar until June 2022.

International career
Topalović got called up to the Bosnia and Herzegovina national U21 team on 11 March 2019.

He made his debut for the national team on 5 June 2019, in a friendly game against Malta, which ended up in a 0–0 draw.

Career statistics

Club

Honours
Borac Banja Luka
First League of RS: 2018–19

References

External links
Kenan Topolović at Sofascore
Kenan Topolović profile at footballdatabase.eu

1998 births
Living people
Sportspeople from Slavonski Brod
Bosniaks of Croatia
Association football goalkeepers
Bosnia and Herzegovina footballers
Bosnia and Herzegovina under-21 international footballers
HNK Cibalia players
NK Inter Zaprešić players
FK Borac Banja Luka players
HŠK Zrinjski Mostar players
FK Rudar Prijedor players
Croatian Football League players 
First League of the Republika Srpska players
Premier League of Bosnia and Herzegovina players